Josh Blackburn (born November 13, 1978 in North Pole, Alaska) is a retired American ice hockey goaltender.

Playing career
He played college hockey for the Michigan Wolverines. After turning professional, he played for the Augusta Lynx and Columbia Inferno in the ECHL and the Corpus Christi Rayz of the Central Hockey League.

After retiring from professional hockey in 2005, Blackburn became a goaltending consultant and opened his own goaltending school. In 2007, Blackburn returned to the University of Michigan as a volunteer assistant coach. In 2018, Blackburn joined Total Package Hockey, a hockey development program, as a goaltending coach.

Awards and honours

References

External links
Career Stats

1978 births
Living people
American men's ice hockey goaltenders
Augusta Lynx players
Columbia Inferno players
Corpus Christi Rayz players
Ice hockey people from Oklahoma
Michigan Wolverines men's ice hockey players
People from Oklahoma County, Oklahoma
Arizona Coyotes draft picks
People from Fairbanks North Star Borough, Alaska